Stanley Electric Co., Ltd.  is a Japanese manufacturer of electric lights. Stanley has 36 consolidated subsidiaries, three associated companies, 23 factories in eight countries, offices in 17 countries, and over 16,000 employees.

The main customers for its core business, automotive lighting, are Honda and Nissan. Other customers using Stanley's products include Toyota, Mazda, Suzuki, Mitsubishi, Ford and Chrysler. Stanley is listed in the TOPIX of the Tokyo Stock Exchange.

History

Initially Kitano Shokai, the company was founded in 1920 by Takaharu Kitano. At the time, only about 8,000 cars were present in Japan, all of them imported.

In 1933, the company became incorporated as a kabushiki gaisha and was renamed after explorer Henry Morton Stanley, who was famous for exploring Africa. As the company states, Kitano was impressed by Stanley's vision, courage and pioneering spirit. A branch in Osaka was established the following year. From 1943 to 1949, the company was known as Kitano Denki Kogyo Co., Ltd. .

Stanley was first listed on the Tokyo Stock Exchange in 1961.

1965: Start of silicon processing
1968: First international branch in Taiwan
1968: First research center for lightning
1979: First branch in the USA (Stanley US)
1980: Development of colored liquid crystals
1984: Branch in France
Until 2009: Many branches in Europe, North and South America, Asia and Australia. Stanley and the German company Hella founded a joint venture based in Melbourne in 2002.

Operations

Stanley's products include HID and LED headlights. Stanley developed the world's first LED high-mount stop lamp.

Stanley also produces all types of automotive lighting, backlighted LED displays, camera flashes, automotive interior displays, sensors, light fixtures and streetlights, as used in Shanghai and Tokyo.

In 2013, Stanley announced plans to concentrate more on the development of LED headlights and planned to raise the LED share from 1% to 20% by 2017.

Research and development

Stanley conducts research and development at 5 research centres in Japan, where new light technologies are explored, existing technologies are optimized, and new products are developed. One such research centre is located in Tsukuba. Research results are regularly published in scientific journals.

Motorsport

Until March 2021, Stanley sold aftermarket products under the motorsport-inspired Raybrig brand, which also sponsored Team Kunimitsu in Super GT. After Team Kunimitsu won the 2020 GT500 Championship, bringing an end to a 25-year sponsorship, Stanley itself replaced Raybrig as the team's main sponsor for 2021.

Social involvement

Founder Takaharu Kitano also established the Kitano Foundation of Lifelong Integrated Education in 1975, which awards scholarships to those who can not afford education. The foundation is active in Japan, China, Vietnam, the Philippines, India and other countries. 

Stanley is also the title sponsor of the Stanley Ladies Golf Tournament, a women's golf series managed by the LPGA that also funds the construction of schools in Kenya.

Event sponsorship

Stanley takes part in illumination events worldwide. At festivities marking 150 years of Japanese-German friendship, the Brandenburg Gate in Berlin was illuminated with LED flood lights in 2011. Stanley LED lights were installed outside the Kabuki-za in Ginza before its reopening in 2013. Both lighting arrangements were conducted in cooperation with lighting artist Makoto Ishii.

References

External links

 Kitano Foundation website 
Stanley Ladies Golf Tournament website 

Electronics companies of Japan
Engineering companies based in Tokyo
Automotive companies based in Tokyo
Motorcycle parts manufacturers
Manufacturing companies based in Tokyo
Companies listed on the Tokyo Stock Exchange
Light-emitting diode manufacturers
Auto parts suppliers of Japan
Electronics companies established in 1920
Manufacturing companies established in 1920
Japanese companies established in 1920
Japanese brands